Sinomimovelleda dentihumeralis is a species of beetle in the family Cerambycidae. It was described by Chiang in 1963.

References

Parmenini
Beetles described in 1963